Final standings of the Hungarian League 1934–35 season

Final standings

Results

External links
 IFFHS link

Nemzeti Bajnokság I seasons
Hun
1